Kowloon RFC is a rugby club based at King's Park, Kowloon, Hong Kong.

History
The club was founded in 1976 by John Eastman, David Lacey, and Bill Trotter. They were supported by a donation of HK$3,000 from Vernon Roberts, the chairman of Hongkong Land.

2012–2013 Squad
in bold = players internationals

Notable players 
 David Tait – former Sale Sharks player. Died in December 2012.
 Ignacio Elosu – Argentina U21 international, former Castres Olympique and Exeter Chiefs player.
 Eni Gesinde – former Newcastle Falcons player.
 Henjo Van Niekerk – South Africa U19 international, former Blue Bulls and Venezia Mestre Rugby FC player..
 Tom Bury – Scotland U20 and Scotland 7's international.
 Adam Dehaty – England U21 international, former Newcastle Falcons player.
 Mike Waywell – England Counties XV international.
 Mark Goosen – Hong Kong international.
 Alex Harris – Hong Kong international.
 So Hok Ken – Hong Kong international.
 Andy Li – Hong Kong international.
 Chris McAdam – Hong Kong international.
 Alan Graham – Hong Kong international.
 Tom McColl – Hong Kong international.
 Jeff Wong – Hong Kong international.
 Leon Wei – Hong Kong international.
 Jonny Rees – Hong Kong international.
 Tomasi Lawa – Hong Kong international.
 Eni Gesidne – Hong Kong international.
 Don Rintoul – Hong Kong international.
 Peter Clough – Hong Kong international.

References

External links
 

1976 establishments in Hong Kong
Hong Kong rugby union teams